Aliabad or Ali Abad may refer to:

Afghanistan
'Aliabad, a town in Aliabad District, Kunduz Province

Azerbaijan
Aliabad, Bilasuvar, Azerbaijan
Aliabad, Jalilabad, Azerbaijan
Aliabad, Lerik (disambiguation), Azerbaijan
Aliabad, Nakhchivan, Azerbaijan
Aliabad, Saatly, Azerbaijan
Aliabad, Zaqatala, Azerbaijan

India
Aliabad, Hyderabad, suburb of Hyderabad, India
Aliabad, Ranga Reddy, a village in Telangana, India

Iran

Alborz Province
Aliabad-e Guneh, a village in Karaj County, Alborz Province, Iran

Ardabil Province
Aliabad, former name of Kharabeh-ye Kohal, Iran
Aliabad, Khalkhal, a village in Khalkhal County
Aliabad, Shahrud, Khalkhal, a village in Khalkhal County
Aliabad, Kowsar, a village in Kowsar County
Aliabad, Meshgin Shahr, a village in Meshgin Shahr County
Aliabad, Arshaq, a village in Meshgin Shahr County
Aliabad, Nir, a village in Nir County

Bushehr Province
Aliabad, Dashti, a village in Dashti County
Aliabad, Jam, a village in Jam County
Aliabad-e Jainag, a village in Tangestan County

Chaharmahal and Bakhtiari Province
Aliabad, Borujen, a village in Borujen County
Aliabad, Lordegan, a village in Lordegan County
Aliabad-e Poshteh, a village in Lordegan County

East Azerbaijan Province
Aliabad, Ahar, a village in Ahar County
Aliabad, Bostanabad, a village in Bostanabad County
Aliabad-e Olya, East Azerbaijan, a village in Hashtrud County
Aliabad-e Sofla, East Azerbaijan, a village in Hashtrud County
Aliabad, Kaleybar, a village in Kaleybar County
Aliabad, Khoda Afarin, a village in Khoda Afarin County
Aliabad, Malekan, a village in Malekan County
Aliabad-e Qeshlaq, a village in Malekan County
Aliabad, Maragheh, a village in Maragheh County
Aliabad, Osku, a village in Osku County
Aliabad, Varzaqan, a village in Varzaqan County
Aliabad Rural District (Hashtrud County), Hashtrud County

Fars Province

Abadeh County
Aliabad, Bidak, a village in Abadeh County

Arsanjan County
Aliabad-e Malek, a village in Arsanjan County
Aliabad-e Salar, a village in Arsanjan County
Aliabad-e Malek Rural District, in Arsanjan County

Bavanat County
Aliabad, Bavanat, a village in Bavanat County

Darab County
Aliabad, Darab, a village in Darab County

Eqlid County
Aliabad, Eqlid, a village in Eqlid County

Estahban County
Aliabad-e Shams, a village in Estahban County

Fasa County
Aliabad, Fasa, a village in Fasa County
Aliabad, Sheshdeh and Qarah Bulaq, a village in Fasa County
Aliabad-e Sorkhak, a village in Fasa County

Gerash County

Jahrom County
Aliabad, Jahrom, a village in Jahrom County
Aliabad-e Nasir Khani, a village in Jahrom County
Aliabad Rural District (Fars Province), in Jahrom County

Kavar County
Aliabad, Kavar, a village in Kavar County

Kazerun County
Aliabad, Kazerun, a village in Kazerun County
Aliabad, Balyan, a village in Kazerun County
Aliabad, Jereh and Baladeh, a village in Kazerun County
Aliabad, Kuhmareh, a village in Kazerun County
Aliabad-e Musehli, a village in Kazerun County

Khorrambid County
Aliabad-e Bejuyeh, a village in Khorrambid County

Lamerd County
Aliabad, Lamerd, a village in Lamerd County
Aliabad-e Jowhari, a village in Lamerd County

Larestan County
Aliabad, Larestan, a village in Larestan County
Aliabad, Beyram, a village in Larestan County
Aliabad-e Kohneh, Fars, a village in Larestan County
Aliabad-e Owkoshi, a village in Larestan County
Aliabad-e Zahd Mahmud, a village in Larestan County

Mamasani County

Marvdasht County
Aliabad-e Olya, Fars, a village in Marvdasht County
Aliabad-e Sofla, Marvdasht, a village in Marvdasht County

Neyriz County
Aliabad, Neyriz, a village in Neyriz County
Aliabad-e Shur, Fars, a village in Neyriz County
Aliabad, Qatruyeh, a village in Neyriz County
Aliabad (Aliabad-e Qadim), Qatruyeh, a village in Neyriz County

Pasargad County
Aliabad, Pasargad, a village in Pasargad County

Qir and Karzin County
Aliabad, Qir and Karzin, a village in Qir and Karzin County

Sepidan County
Aliabad, Sepidan, a village in Sepidan County
Aliabad, Hamaijan, a village in Sepidan County
Aliabad-e Qoroq, a village in Sepidan County
Aliabad-e Sar Tang, a village in Sepidan County
Aliabad-e Sar Tol, Fars, a village in Sepidan County

Shiraz County
Aliabad, Kaftarak, a village in Shiraz County
Aliabad, Qarah Bagh, a village in Shiraz County
Aliabad-e Khvoshablu, a village in Shiraz County
Aliabad-e Qarchi, a village in Shiraz County
Aliabad-e Seh Tolan, a village in Shiraz County

Gilan Province
Aliabad, Amlash, a village in Amlash County
Aliabad, alternate name of Garmay Sara, a village in Amlash County
Aliabad, Bandar-e Anzali, a village in Bandar-e Anzali County
Aliabad Sara, a village in Langarud County
Aliabad, Rasht, a village in Rasht County
Aliabad, Rudbar, a village in Rudbar County
Aliabad, Rudsar, a village in Rudsar County
Aliabad, Kelachay, a village in Rudsar County
Aliabad, Siahkal, a village in Siahkal County
Aliabad-e Ziba Kenar Rural District

Golestan Province
Aliabad or Aliabad-e Katul, a city in Aliabad County
Aliabad-e Sistaniha, a village in Gonbad-e Qabus County
Aliabad-e Kenar Shahr, a village in Goran County
Shir Aliabad, a village in Gorgan County
Aliabad County

Hamadan Province
Aliabad-e Ayvora, a village in Asadabad County
Aliabad-e Pir Shams ol Din, a village in Asadabad County
Aliabad-e Aq Hesar, a village in Hamadan County
Aliabad-e Posht Shahr, a village in Hamadan County
Aliabad-e Varkaneh, a village in Hamadan County
Aliabad, Kabudarahang, a village in Kabudarahang County
Aliabad, Malayer, a village in Malayer County
Aliabad-e Damaq, a village in Malayer County
Aliabad, Nahavand, a village in Nahavand County
Aliabad, Tuyserkan, a village in Tuyserkan County

Hormozgan Province
Aliabad, Bandar Abbas, a village in Bandar Abbas County
Aliabad, Bashagard, a village in Bashagard County
Aliabad-e Sarhadi, a village in Bashagard County
Aliabad, Hajjiabad, a village in Hajjiabad County
Shahrak-e Aliabad, Hormozgan, a village in Jask County
Aliabad, Minab, a village in Minab County
Aliabad, Jaghin, a village in Rudan County
Aliabad, Rudkhaneh, a village in Rudan County

Ilam Province
Aliabad, Abdanan, a village in Abdanan County
Aliabad, Darreh Shahr, a village in Darreh Shahr County
Aliabad-e Bozorg, a village in Dehloran County
Aliabad-e Kuchak, a village in Dehloran County
Aliabad-e Olya, Ilam, a village in Shirvan and Chardaval County
Aliabad-e Sofla, Ilam, a village in Shirvan and Chardaval County
Aliabad-e Vosta, a village in Shirvan and Chardaval County

Isfahan Province

Aran va Bidgol County
Aliabad, Aran va Bidgol, a village in Aran va Bidgol County
Aliabad, Sefiddasht, a village in Aran va Bidgol County

Ardestan County
Aliabad, Barzavand, a village in Ardestan County
Aliabad, Hombarat, a village in Ardestan County
Aliabad, Olya, a village in Ardestan County
Aliabad (33°34′ N 52°27′ E), Rigestan, a village in Ardestan County
Aliabad-e Qahsareh, a village in Ardestan County

Borkhan County
Aliabad Chi, a village in Borkhan County
Aliabad-e Molla Ali, a village in Borkhan County

Chadegan County
Aliabad, Chadegan, a village in Chadegan County
Aliabad, Chenarud, a village in Chadegan County

Dehaqan County
Aliabad, Musaabad, a village in Dehaqan County
Aliabad, Qombovan, a village in Dehaqan County

Falavarjan County
Aliabad, Falavarjan, a village in Falavarjan County

Golpayegan County
Aliabad, Golpayegan, a village in Golpayegan County

Isfahan County
Aliabad, Isfahan, a village in Isfahan County
Aliabad, Jabal, a village in Isfahan County
Aliabad, Tudeshk, a village in Isfahan County

Kashan County
Aliabad, Kashan, a village in Kashan County

Nain County

Najafabad County
Aliabad, Najafabad, a village in Najafabad County
Aliabad, Sadeqiyeh, a village in Najafabad County
Aliabad-e Kahriz Sang, former name of Kahriz Sang, a city in Najafabad County

Semirom County
Aliabad, Semirom, a village in Semirom County
Aliabad, Padena, a village in Semirom County
Aliabad-e Deh Kord, a village in Semirom County

Tiran and Karvan County
Aliabad, Tiran and Karvan, a village in Tiran and Karvan County

Kerman Province

Anar County
Aliabad, Anar, a village in Anar County

Anbarabad County
Aliabad-e Khazayi-ye Aliabad-e Marki, a village in Anbarabad County
Aliabad-e Qadiri, a village in Anbarabad County
Aliabad-e Sadat, Anbarabad, a village in Anbarabad County
Aliabad Rural District (Kerman Province)

Arzuiyeh County
Aliabad, Dehsard, a village in Arzuiyeh County
Aliabad, Soghan, a village in Arzuiyeh County
Aliabad-e Qotb ol Din, a village in Arzuiyeh County
Aliabad-e Shamshir Bar, a village in Arzuiyeh County
Aliabad-e Takht-e Khvajeh, a village in Arzuiyeh County

Baft County
Aliabad, Baft, a village in Baft County
Aliabad-e Yek, Baft, a village in Baft County

Bam County
Aliabad, Bam, a village in Bam County

Bardsir County

Fahraj County
Aliabad, Fahraj, a village in Fahraj County
Aliabad-e Chahdegan, a village in Fahraj County
Aliabad-e Mohammad Qasem Khan, a village in Fahraj County
Aliabad-e Vali Shahanvazi, a village in Fahraj County

Jiroft County
Aliabad, Dowlatabad, a village in Jiroft County
Aliabad, Halil, a village in Jiroft County
Aliabad, Rezvan, a village in Jiroft County
Aliabad, Sarduiyeh, a village in Jiroft County

Kerman County
Aliabad, Kerman, a village in Kerman County
Aliabad, Baghin, a village in Kerman County
Aliabad, Golbaf, a village in Kerman County
Aliabad, Rayen, a village in Kerman County
Aliabad, Shahdad, a village in Kerman County
Aliabad, alternate name for Valiabad, Shahdad, a village in Kerman County
Aliabad-e Hojjat, a village in Kerman County
Aliabad-e Jahr, a village in Kerman County

Narmashir County
Aliabad, Narmashir, a village in Narmashir County
Aliabad-e Tadayyon, a village in Narmashir County
Aliabad-e Ziaabad, a village in Narmashir County
Aliabad-e Zinbiyeh, a village in Narmashir County

Rabor County
Aliabad, Hanza, a village in Rabor County

Rafsanjan County
Aliabad, Rafsanjan, a village in Rafsanjan County
Aliabad, Darreh Doran, a village in Rafsanjan County
Aliabad, Ferdows, a village in Rafsanjan County
Aliabad, Koshkuiyeh, a village in Rafsanjan County
Aliabad, Nuq, a village in Rafsanjan County
Aliabad, Razmavaran, a village in Rafsanjan County
Aliabad, Sarcheshmeh, a village in Rafsanjan County
Aliabad-e Enqelab, Kerman, a village in Rafsanjan County
Aliabad-e Herati, a village in Rafsanjan County
Aliabad-e Moftabad, a village in Rafsanjan County
Aliabad-e Shahid, Kerman, a village in Rafsanjan County

Ravar County
Aliabad-e Yek, Ravar, a village in Ravar County
Aliabad-e Kuh Namaki, a village in Ravar County

Rigan County
Aliabad-e Posht-e Rig, a village in Rigan County
Aliabad, Gonbaki, a village in Rigan County

Rudbar-e Jonubi County
Aliabad, Rudbar-e Jonubi, a village in Rudbar-e Jonubi County
Aliabad, Jazmurian, a village in Rudbar-e Jonubi County
Aliabad-e Olya, Kerman, a village in Rudbar-e Jonubi County
Aliabad-e Sofla, Rudbar-e Jonubi, a village in Rudbar-e Jonubi County

Shahr-e Babak County
Aliabad, Estabraq, a village in Shahr-e Babak County
Aliabad, Khursand, a village in Shahr-e Babak County
Aliabad-e Rugushuiyeh, a village in Shahr-e Babak County

Sirjan County
Aliabad, Sharifabad, a village in Sirjan County

Zarand County
Aliabad, Zarand, a village in Zarand County
Aliabad, Yazdanabad, a village in Zarand County

Kermanshah Province
Aliabad, Dalahu, a village in Dalahu County
Aliabad, Eslamabad-e Gharb, a village in Eslamabad-e Gharb County
Aliabad, Homeyl, a village in Eslamabad-e Gharb County
Aliabad, Gilan-e Gharb, a village in Gilan-e Gharb County
Aliabad, Cham Chamal, a village in Harsin County
Aliabad, Shizar, a village in Harsin County
Aliabad-e Kashantu, a village in Harsin County
Aliabad-e Kohneh, a village in Javanrud County
Aliabad-e Sasal, a village in Javanrud County
Aliabad, Kangavar, a village in Kangavar County
Aliabad-e Avval, a village in Kangavar County
Aliabad-e Dovvom, a village in Kangavar County
Aliabad, Kermanshah, a village in Kermanshah County
Aliabad, Firuzabad, a village in Kermanshah County
Aliabad, Kuzaran, a village in Kermanshah County
Aliabad-e Olya, Kermanshah, a village in Kermanshah County
Aliabad-e Sofla, Kermanshah, a village in Kermanshah County
Aliabad, Ravansar, a village in Ravansar County
Aliabad, Sahneh, a village in Sahneh County
Aliabad-e Garus, a village in Sahneh County
Aliabad, Sonqor, a village in Sonqor County
Aliabad-e Yusefi, a village in Sonqor County

Khuzestan Province
Aliabad, Andika, a village in Andika County
Aliabad, Andimeshk, a village in Andimeshk County
Aliabad-e Hufel, a village in Dasht-e Azadegan County
Aliabad, Howmeh-ye Sharqi, a village in Izeh County
Aliabad, Margha, a village in Izeh County
Aliabad-e Olya, Khuzestan, a village in Lali County
Aliabad-e Sofla, Khuzestan, a village in Lali County
Aliabad, Tolbozan, a village in Masjed Soleyman County
Aliabad, Tombi Golgir, a village in Masjed Soleyman County
Aliabad-e Kabedan, a village in Masjed Soleyman County
Aliabad, Omidiyeh, a village in Omidiyeh County

Kohgiluyeh and Boyer-Ahmad Province
Aliabad-e Mokhtar, a village in Boyer-Ahmad County
Aliabad-e Sartol, Kohgiluyeh and Boyer-Ahmad, a village in Boyer-Ahmad County
Aliabad-e Kareyak, a village in Dana County
Aliabad-e Kukhdan, a village in Dana County
Aliabad-e Ab Kaseh, a village in Kohgiluyeh County

Kurdistan Province
Aliabad, Najafabad, Bijar, a village in Bijar County
Aliabad, Siyah Mansur, a village in Bijar County
Aliabad-e Luch, a village in Dehgolan County
Aliabad-e Moshir, a village in Dehgolan County
Aliabad, Divandarreh, a village in Divandarreh County
Aliabad-e Duleh Rash, a village in Divandarreh County
Aliabad-e Karaftu, a village in Divandarreh County
Aliabad-e Maran, a village in Divandarreh County
Aliabad, Qorveh, a village in Qorveh County
Aliabad, Sanandaj, a village in Sanandaj County
Aliabad-e Bezindar, a village in Sanandaj County
Aliabad, Kalatrazan, a village in Sanandaj County
Aliabad, Saqqez, a village in Saqqez County

Lorestan Province

Aligudarz County
Aliabad, Mahru, a village in Mahru Rural District, Zaz va Mahru District, Aligudarz County
Aliabad, Zaz-e Sharqi, a village in Zaz-e Sharqi Rural District, Zaz va Mahru District, Aligudarz County
Aliabad Darreh Moshk, a village in Aligudarz County

Azna County
Aliabad, Azna, a village in Azna County

Borujerd County
Aliabad, Borujerd, a village in Borujerd County

Delfan County
Aliabad (34°02′ N 48°10′ E), Khaveh-ye Jonubi, a village in Khaveh-ye Jonubi Rural District, Central District of Delfan County
Aliabad (34°03′ N 48°11′ E), Khaveh-ye Jonubi, a village in Khaveh-ye Jonubi Rural District, Central District of Delfan County
Aliabad, Mirbag-e Jonubi, a village in Mirbag-e Jonubi Rural District, Central District of Delfan County
Aliabad Cheragh, a village in the Central District of Delfan County
Aliabad-e Gavkosh, a village in the Central District of Delfan County
Aliabad Jadid, a village in the Central District of Delfan County
Aliabad, Kakavand, a village in Kakavand District, Delfan County
Aliabad-e Cheragh, a village in Delfan County
Aliabad-e Pirdusti, a village in Delfan County
Gashur-e Aliabad, a village in Delfan County
Gorg Aliabad, a village in Delfan County
Hoseyn Aliabad, Lorestan, a village in Delfan County
Shahrak-e Aliabad, Lorestan, a village in Delfan County

Dorud County
Aliabad, Dorud, a village in Dorud County

Khorramabad County
Aliabad (33°23′ N 48°37′ E), Khorramabad, a village in the Central District of Khorramabad County
Aliabad (33°24′ N 48°37′ E), Khorramabad, a village in the Central District of Khorramabad County
Aliabad, Zagheh, a village in Zagheh District, Khorramabad County
Aliabad-e Beyg Reza, a village in Khorramabad County
Aliabad-e Chahi, a village in Khorramabad County
Aliabad Parsaneh, a village in Khorramabad County
Aliabad Piameni, a village in Khorramabad County

Kuhdasht County
Aliabad Nazar Alivand, a village in Kuhdasht County
Alinabad, a village in Kuhdasht County
Choqapur Aliabad, a village in Kuhdasht County
Ganj Aliabad-e Olya, a village in Kuhdasht County
Ganj Aliabad-e Sofla, a village in Kuhdasht County

Selseleh County
Aliabad, Doab, a village in Doab Rural District, Central District, Selseleh County
Aliabad, Qaleh-ye Mozaffari, a village in Qaleh-ye Mozaffari Rural District, Central District, Selseleh County
Aliabad-e Bar Aftab, a village in Selseleh County
Aliabad-e Bar Anazar, a village in Selseleh County
Aliabad-e Cheshmeh Barqi, a village in Selseleh County
Aliabad-e Javanmard, a village in Selseleh County
Aliabad-e Olya, Lorestan, a village in Selseleh County
Aliabad-e Sofla, Lorestan, a village in Selseleh County
Mohammad Aliabad, Lorestan, a village in Selseleh County

Markazi Province
Aliabad, Moshkabad, a village in Arak County
Aliabad, Shamsabad, a village in Arak County
Aliabad, Farahan, a village in Farahan County
Aliabad, Ashna Khvor, a village in Khomeyn County
Aliabad, Galehzan, a village in Khomeyn County
Aliabad, Kamareh, a village in Khomeyn County
Aliabad, Khondab, a village in Khondab County
Aliabad, Komijan, a village in Komijan County
Aliabad-e Sanjeh Bashi, a village in Mahallat County
Aliabad, Saveh, a village in Saveh County
Aliabad, Qarah Kahriz, a village in Shazand County
Aliabad, Khoshkrud, a village in Zarandieh County

Mazandaran Province
Aliabad, Babol, a village in Babol County
Aliabad, Babolsar, a village in Babolsar County
Aliabad, Behshahr, a village in Behshahr County
Aliabad-e Chalus, a village in Chalus County
Aliabad, Juybar, a village in Juybar County
Aliabad, Mahmudabad, a village in Mahmudabad County
Aliabad-e Asgarkhan, a village in Nowshahr County
Aliabad-e Mir, a village in Nowshahr County
Aliabad, Nur, a village in Nur County
Aliabad, former name of Qaem Shahr, Iran
Aliabad, Sari, a village in Tonekabon County
Aliabad, Tonekabon, a village in Tonekabon County
Aliabad, Goli Jan, a village in Tonekabon County
Aliabad Rural District (Mazandaran Province)

North Khorasan Province
Aliabad, Bojnord, a village in Bojnord County
Aliabad, Esfarayen, a village in Esfarayen County
Aliabad-e Alu, a village in Esfarayen County
Aliabad-e Qarah Chay, a village in Maneh and Samalqan County

Qazvin Province

Buin Zahra County
Aliabad, Abgarm, a village in Abgarm District, Buin Zahra County
Aliabad, Avaj, a village in Avaj District, Buin Zahra County
Aliabad, Dashtabi, a village in Dashtabi District, Buin Zahra County
Aliabad, Ramand, a village in Ramand District, Buin Zahra County

Qazvin County
Aliabad, Alamut-e Gharbi, a village in Alamut-e Gharbi District, Qazvin County
Aliabad, Tarom Sofla, a village in Tarom Sofla District, Qazvin County

Qom Province
Aliabad, Qom
Aliabad, Salafchegan
Aliabad-e Enqelab, Qom
Aliabad-e Nazarali Khan

Razavi Khorasan Province

Bardaskan County
Aliabad, Bardaskan, a village in Bardaskan County
Aliabad-e Keshmar, a village in Bardaskan County
Ali Abadak, Razavi Khorasan, a village in Bardaskan County

Chenaran County
Aliabad, Chenaran, a village in Chenaran County
Aliabad, Golbajar, a village in Chenaran County
Aliabad-e Bahman Jan, a village in Chenaran County

Dargaz County
Aliabad-e Alanchag, a village in Dargaz County

Fariman County
Aliabad, Fariman, a village in Fariman County

Firuzeh County
Aliabad, Firuzeh, a village in Firuzeh County
Aliabad, Taghenkoh, a village in Firuzeh County

Kashmar County
Aliabad, Kuhsorkh, a village in Kashmar County
Abkuh Aliabad, a village in Kashmar County

Khalilabad County
Aliabad-e Shur, Khalilabad, a village in Khalilabad County

Khvaf County
Aliabad, Khvaf, a village in Khvaf County
Aliabad-e Jadid, a village in Khvaf County

Mahvelat County
Aliabad-e Olya, Razavi Khorasan, a village in Mahvelat County
Aliabad-e Sofla, Razavi Khorasan, a village in Mahvelat County
Aliabad-e Vasat, a village in Mahvelat County

Mashhad County
Aliabad, Mashhad, a village in Mashhad County
Aliabad-e Emam, a village in Mashhad County

Nishapur County
Aliabad, Nishapur, a village in Nishapur County
Aliabad, Miyan Jolgeh, a village in Nishapur County
Aliabad, Zeberkhan, a village in Nishapur County
Aliabad-e Shahid, Razavi Khorasan, a village in Nishapur County
Aliabad-e Takeh, a village in Nishapur County

Quchan County
Aliabad, Quchan, a village in Quchan County

Rashtkhvar County
Aliabad-e Daman, a village in Rashtkhvar County

Sabzevar County
Aliabad-e Kalkhuni, a village in Sabzevar County
Aliabad-e Seyyed Rahim, a village in Sabzevar County
Aliabad-e Shur, Sabzevar, a village in Sabzevar County
Aliabad-e Tarkan, a village in Sabzevar County

Torbat-e Heydarieh County

Torbat-e Jam County
Aliabad, Nasrabad, a village in Torbat-e Jam County
Aliabad, Pain Jam, a village in Torbat-e Jam County

Zaveh County
Aliabad, Zaveh, a village in Zaveh County

Semnan Province
Aliabad-e Motalleb Khan, a village in Damghan County
Aliabad, Mehdishahr, a village in Mehdishahr County
Aliabad, Shahrud, a village in Shahrud County
Aliabad, Bastam, a village in Shahrud County

Sistan and Baluchestan Province
Aliabad, Bampur, a village in Bampur County
Aliabad, Dalgan, a village in Dalgan County
Aliabad (Aliabad-e Chahjangikhan), Dalgan, a village in Dalgan County
Aliabad-e Goldasht, a village in Dalgan County
Aliabad-e Ladi, a village in Dalgan County
Aliabad, Iranshahr, a village in Iranshahr County
Aliabad, Bazman, a village in Iranshahr County
Aliabad, Karvandar, a village in Khash County
Aliabad, Nukabad, a village in Khash County
Aliabad, Sangan, a village in Khash County
Aliabad, Qasr-e Qand, a village in Qasr-e Qand County

South Khorasan Province

Birjand County
Aliabad-e Davarabad, a village in Birjand County
Aliabad-e Luleh, a village in Birjand County

Boshruyeh County
Aliabad, Eresk, a village in Boshruyeh County

Darmian County
Aliabad, Darmian, a village in Darmian County
Aliabad-e Fakhrud, a village in Darmian County
Aliabad-e Farhang, a village in Darmian County

Khusf County
Aliabad, Khusf, a village in Khusf County
Aliabad, Barakuh, a village in Khusf County
Aliabad, Jolgeh-e Mazhan, a village in Khusf County
Aliabad, Qaleh Zari, a village in Khusf County
Aliabad-e Zarein, a village in Khusf County

Nehbandan County
Aliabad, Nehbandan, a village in Nehbandan County
Aliabad-e Chah-e Shand, a village in Nehbandan County
Aliabad, alternate name of Chah-e Talqori, Shusef, a village in Nehbandan County
Aliabad, alternate name of Kalateh-ye Aliabad, South Khorasan, a village in Nehbandan County

Qaen County
Aliabad-e Olya, South Khorasan, a village in Qaen County
Aliabad-e Sofla, South Khorasan, a village in Qaen County
Aliabad Musaviyeh, a village in Qaen County

Sarbisheh County
Aliabad, Sarbisheh, a village in Sarbisheh County
Aliabad, Mud, a village in Sarbisheh County
Aliabad-e Kahak, a village in Sarbisheh County

Tabas County
Aliabad, Tabas, a village in Tabas County
Aliabad, Dastgerdan, a village in Tabas County

Zirkuh County
Aliabad, Zirkuh, a village in Zirkuh County

Tehran Province
Aliabad, Eslamshahr, a village in Eslamshahr County
Aliabad, Robat Karim, a village in Robat Karim County
Aliabad, former name of Shahedshahr, Iran
Aliabad-e Ahiyeh, a village in Pishva County
Aliabad-e Bagh-e Khvas, a village in Varamin County
Aliabad-e Farasudeh, a village in Varamin County
Aliabad-e Khaleseh, a village in Pishva County
Aliabad-e Kharabeh, a village in Pakdasht County
Aliabad-e Mohit, a village in Varamin County
Aliabad-e Mowqufeh, a village in Rey County
Aliabad-e Qeysariyyeh, a village in Rey County
Aliabad-e Tapancheh, a village in Eslamshahr County
Aliabad-e Vali, a village in Damavand County
Aliabad-e Zavareh Bid, a village in Pishva County

West Azerbaijan Province
Aliabad, Chaldoran, a village in Chaldoran County
Aliabad, Chaypareh, a village in Chaypareh County
Aliabad, Maku, a village in Maku County
Aliabad, Naqadeh, a village in Naqadeh County
Aliabad, Dasht-e Bil, a village in Oshnavieh County
Aliabad, Oshnavieh-ye Shomali, a village in Oshnavieh County
Aliabad, Shahin Dezh, a village in Shahin Dezh County
Aliabad, Takab, a village in Takab County
Aliabad, Urmia, a village in Urmia County
Aliabad-e Baran Duz, a village in Urmia County

Yazd Province

Abarkuh County

Ardakan County
Aliabad, Kharanaq, a village in Ardakan County

Bafq County
Aliabad-e Basab, a village in Bafq County
Aliabad-e Gowd Ginestan, a village in Bafq County

Behabad County
Aliabad, Jolgeh, a village in Behabad County

Khatam County
Aliabad, Khatam, a village in Khatam County

Mehriz County
Aliabad, Bahadoran, a village in Mehriz County
Aliabad, Ernan, a village in Mehriz County
Aliabad Feyaz, a village in Mehriz County

Saduq County
Aliabad, Saduq, a village in Saduq County
Aliabad Brick Company, a village in Saduq County

Taft County
Aliabad, Aliabad, a village in Taft County
Aliabad, Banadkuk, a village in Taft County
Aliabad-e Sadri, a village in Taft County
Aliabad Rural District (Taft County)

Yazd County
Aliabad-e Dashti, a village in Yazd County

Zanjan Province
Aliabad, Abhar, a village in Abhar County
Aliabad, Khodabandeh, a village in Khodabandeh County
Aliabad, Zanjanrud, a village in Zanjan County
Aliabad-e Moini, a village in Zanjan County
Aliabad-e Sharqi, a village in Zanjan County

Pakistan
Aliabad, Hunza, Northern Areas, Pakistan
Aliabad, Khyber Pakhtunkhwa, Pakistan

See also
Aliabad-e Bala (disambiguation)
Aliabad-e Olya (disambiguation)
Aliabad-e Pain (disambiguation)
Aliabad-e Sofla (disambiguation)
Aliabad-e Yek (disambiguation)
Mohammad Aliabad (disambiguation)